John Francis O'Brien (19 September 1937 – 10 May 2022) was an Australian rules footballer who played with North Melbourne in the Victorian Football League (VFL).

O'Brien, a centreman, made 16 appearances for North Melbourne in the 1959 VFL season and played a further 10 games in 1960. He spent most of the 1961 season in the reserves and won the Gardiner Medal.

After leaving North Melbourne, O'Brien played for North West Football Union (NWFU) club Ulverstone before transferring to Central District Football Club, taking part in their inaugural South Australian National Football League (SANFL) season in 1964.

References

1937 births
2022 deaths
Australian rules footballers from Victoria (Australia)
North Melbourne Football Club players
Central District Football Club players
Ulverstone Football Club players